Bonza Aviation Pty Ltd, operating as Bonza, is an Australian low-cost airline, headquartered on the Sunshine Coast. Bonza commenced operations on 31 January 2023, after receiving approval from the Civil Aviation Safety Authority on 12 January. Bonza plans to predominantly serve under-utilised domestic and regional routes within Australia.

History

Background
Bonza was founded by former Virgin Blue executive Tim Jordan. U.S. investment firm 777 Partners were the inaugural investors and backers.

The airline signalled its intention to disassociate from the main cities of Melbourne, Sydney and Brisbane, instead setting up its headquarters at Sunshine Coast Airport with the aim to grow the market by focussing on under-utilised and unserved routes between regional and domestic cities through a point-to-point network model, similar to that of Ryanair in Europe. As a low-cost carrier, Bonza launched without a frequent-flyer program or airport lounges, and limited bookings solely to its FlyBonza app.

Launch

In October 2021, Bonza was revealed and signalled its intention to begin flying by early 2022. However, the airline did not receive its air operator's certificate from Australian aviation regulatory body CASA until 12 January 2023.

Bonza commenced operations on 31 January 2023, flying from its base at Sunshine Coast to the Whitsundays. They initiated services with five Boeing 737 MAX 8 aircraft in an all-economy configuration, becoming the first Australian airline to operate the Boeing 737 MAX aircraft.

Partnerships

On 4 October 2022, it was announced that Bonza had signed a four-year sponsorship deal with Australian A-League Men's football club Melbourne Victory to be their front-of-shirt principal partner on both their home and away kits.

Destinations
Bonza will commence operations with 27 routes serving 17 destinations in New South Wales, Queensland and Victoria.

Fleet
, the Bonza fleet consists of the following aircraft:

References

External links
Official website

Airlines of Australia
Airlines established in 2021
Low-cost carriers
Australian companies established in 2021